Sir John de Courcy (1150–1219) was an Anglo-Norman knight who arrived in Ireland in 1176. From then until his expulsion in 1204, he conquered a considerable territory, endowed religious establishments, built abbeys for both the Benedictines and the Cistercians and built strongholds at Dundrum Castle in County Down and Carrickfergus Castle in County Antrim.

Early career in Ireland
Belonging to a family which took its name from Courcy, Marne, John de Courcy came to Ireland around the year 1171 as part of the Norman invading forces, brought in as mercenaries working for Diarmaid Mac Murchadha, the ousted King of Leinster, to help him regain his position as king.

De Courcy's exact parentage is unknown. The man thought to be his great-grandfather, Richard de Courcy is named in the Domesday Book. De Courcy's grandfather, William de Courcy I, married Emma de Falaise. His father, William de Courcy II, married Avice de Rumilly and died before 1130, leaving the family estates in Somerset and elsewhere in England to his son, William de Courcy III, John’s possible brother. 

John was very ambitious and wanted lands for himself. He decided to invade the north of Ireland which was controlled by Irish dynasties. In early January 1177, he assembled a small army of 22 knights and 300 foot-soldiers and marched north, at the rate of thirty miles a day. They skirted the back of the Mourne Mountains and took the town of Dún Dá Leathghlas (now Downpatrick) by surprise. After two fierce battles, in February and June 1177, de Courcy defeated the last King of Ulaid, Ruaidhrí Mac Duinnshléibhe.

He did all this without King Henry II's permission.

After conquering eastern Ulster, he established his seat at Carrickfergus, where he built an impressive stone castle. Other monasteries and castles that he built are Inch Abbey and Dundrum. He married Affrica, daughter of Godred II Olafsson, King of Mann. It is likely that the marriage, as in the case of many kings and those aspiring to be kings in those days, was political, to seal an alliance with her father who paid homage to the King of Norway. John and Affreca are not recorded to have had any children. Affreca built a monastery at Greyabbey dedicated to Saint Mary of The Yoke of God. She is buried there and her effigy, in stone, can still be seen.

In 1183, de Courcy provided for the establishment of a priory at the cathedral of Down with generous endowments to the Benedictines from Chester in England (free from all subjugation to Chester Cathedral). This building was destroyed by an earthquake in 1245. He also created a cell for Benedictines at St. Andrews in the Ards (Black Abbey) for the houses of Stoke Courcy in Somerset and Lonlay in France, which was near Inishargy, Kircubbin, in present-day County Down. The early Irish monastery of Nendrum was given to the Benedictine house of St Bees in Cumberland in order that they might also establish a cell. His wife, Affreca, founded the Cistercian monastery of Grey Abbey, Co. Down, as a daughter house of Holm Cultram (Cumberland) in 1193.

He also made incursions into the west to increase his territory and lordship. In 1188 he invaded Connacht, but was repulsed and the next year he plundered Armagh.

Later career in Ireland

After the accession of Richard I in 1189, de Courcy in conjunction with William de Lacy appears in some way to have offended the king by his proceedings in Ireland. De Lacy quickly made his peace with Richard, while de Courcy defied him, and the subsequent history of the latter consisted mainly in the vicissitudes of a lasting feud with the de Lacys. Hugh de Lacy, younger son of Hugh de Lacy Lord of Meath, began to wage war on John de Courcy, capturing him in 1204. An account of his capture appears in the Book of Howth. This passage helps explain why John had a reputation as a strong, God-fearing warrior:

In May 1205, King John made Hugh Earl of Ulster, granting him all the land of the province "as John de Courcy held it on the day when Hugh defeated him". John de Courcy returned, sailing across the Irish sea from the Isle of Man in July 1205 with Norse soldiers and a hundred boats supplied by his brother-in-law, Ragnold, King of Mann. John and his army landed at Strangford and laid siege to Dundrum Castle in vain because the defences he himself had made were too strong.

Holy Land and death 
King John then had John de Courcy imprisoned and he spent the rest of his life in poverty. He was subsequently released when he "crossed himself" to go on a pilgrimage to the Jerusalem. After returning from the Holy Land, De Courcy died in obscurity near present-day Craigavon.

Literary references
The story of John de Courcy's defeat of the French champion, and his winning the privilege to remain covered in the presence of the King, appears in Chapter 12 of Mark Twain's The Prince and the Pauper.

In his book Saint Patrick's Town, Anthony M. Wilson said about John de Courcy:

Genealogy

Family tree I
     
     |                                     |
     |                                     | 
     Baudri the German Vigor
    =niece of Godfrey (?) of Brionn
     |
     |
     |               |         |            |            |            |           |               |  |
     |               |         |            |            |            |           |               |  |
     Nicholas Fulk Robert Richard Baudri Vigor Elizabeth daughters
 de Bacqueville de Alnou de Courcy of Neville of Bocquence of Apulia  =Fulk of Bonneval
    issue        issue     =Hebrea      issue        issue
                               |
                               |
                            Richard
                           =Wandelmode
                               |
     __|
     |              |          |
     |              |          |
     Robert Richard William, died c. 1130. 
    =Rohesia de Grandesmil   =Emma de Falise
     |                         |
     |                         |
   William Robert, died c. 1151.
     |                         |
 de Courcy                   de Courcy
 of France           of England and Ireland

Family tree II

           Serlo de Burci Corbutonis de Falise
            =?                     =Ameline
             |                      | 
             |                      |_
             |                      |               |          |           |
             |                      |               |          |           |
    Martin = Geva de Burci = William de Falise Roger Gaufridus Galterus
           |               |
           |               |_
           |               |                            |
           |               |                            |
  Robert fitz Martin Emma = William de Courcy Sibil = Baldwin de Bullers
                                |
     ___|__
     |                          |            |
     |                          |            |
     William, died c. 1151.     Robert Jordan
   =Avice de Rumelly                        =?
     |                                       |
     |                   |___
     |           |      |                    |          |
     |           |      |                    |          |
     William Robert Richard              John     Jordan
                                             |
                                             |
                                       Baron Kingsale

Derived from Flanders 2009, pp. 177, 178, 180, 181.

References

Sources

1150 births
1219 deaths
Norman participants of the invasion of Ireland
Norman warriors
Prisoners in the Tower of London
Medieval earls of Ulster
Lords Lieutenant of Ireland